Dale Furnace and Forge Historic District, also known as Dale Iron Works and Mt. Chalfont Furnace, is a historic "iron plantation" and national historic district located in Washington Township, Berks County, Pennsylvania.  The district encompasses six contributing buildings and one contributing site.  They are a stone horse barn (c. 1850), stone and frame bank barn (c. 1850), ironmaster's mansion (1791, 1827), smokehouse and wash house (1827), stone worker's house (1830), and counting house (1827, 1854).  The archaeological site includes the ruins of a worker's house, the stone furnace stack (c. 1791), bank iron furnace, forge foundations and race (c. 1804-1811), and remnants of dam breast.  The furnace remained in blast until about 1822, and the Dale Forge was in operation until 1868.

It was listed on the National Register of Historic Places in 1991. It was bought by the Schalls in the 1820s, and it has been passed down through the Schall-Dibbern-Snow family since. The current owner is Natalie Dibbern.

References

Industrial buildings and structures on the National Register of Historic Places in Pennsylvania
Archaeological sites on the National Register of Historic Places in Pennsylvania
Historic districts on the National Register of Historic Places in Pennsylvania
Houses completed in 1827
Historic districts in Berks County, Pennsylvania
National Register of Historic Places in Berks County, Pennsylvania
1827 establishments in Pennsylvania